Murray Rothbard was an economist and political theorist.

Rothbard may also refer to:

 David Rothbard (?–2018), non-profit founder